Saigon: Year of the Cat is a British television drama from 1983, produced by Thames Television for ITV. It is directed by Stephen Frears, written by David Hare, and stars Judi Dench, Frederic Forrest, E. G. Marshall, Wallace Shawn, Chic Murray, and Rong Wongsawan.

Synopsis
The year is 1974, and Barbara Dean (Judi Dench), a British assistant manager in a foreign bank in Saigon, begins a relationship with American Bob Chesneau (Frederic Forrest). She quickly realises that he works for the CIA and he knows that the fall of South Vietnam is very near.

External links
 

1983 television films
1983 films
British television films
Films scored by George Fenton
Films directed by Stephen Frears
Films set in 1974
Vietnam War films